LIRNEasia (Learning Initiatives on Reforms for Network Economies Asia) is an information and communication technology (ICT) policy and regulation think-tank active in the Asia Pacific region. The organization is incorporated under Sri Lankan law as a non-profit organization. It was launched in September 2004 under the leadership of Professor Rohan Samarajiva.

References

External links
 

Think tanks based in Sri Lanka